Cerro Azul de Copán National Park is a national park in Honduras. It was established on 1 January 1987 and covers an area of 154.6 square kilometres. It has an altitude of between 1,800 and 2,285 metres.

References

National parks of Honduras
Protected areas established in 1987
1987 establishments in Honduras
Central American Atlantic moist forests